Deviate is the second studio album by English heavy metal band Kill II This, released on 6 October 1998 by Visible Noise. The album is often considered to be one of their best.

Reception 
Rock Hard magazine approved of the album, comparing it to the music of Clawfinger and Machine Head. French metal band Dagoba considered it one of their top-ten favourite groove metal albums of all time in 2022.

Track listing 
All lyrics written by and music composed by Mark Mynett.

Personnel 
Content adapted from the album's liner notes.

Kill II This 
 Matt Pollock – vocals
 Mark Mynett – guitar
 Caroline Campbell – bass
 Ben Calvert – drums

Other musical roles 
 Jeff Singer – session drums
 Robert "Taf" Girdlestone – narration
 DJ III Dom – scratching
 Sheila M Gott – female vocals
 Taylor Wilson – operatic vocals
 Barney Greenway – additional vocals on "Freedom of Speech" and "The Flood"

Production, other roles 
 Andy Sneap – production, mixing
 Danny Sprigg – engineering
 Kevin Waddington – pre-production
 Ben Aquilina – art direction

Notes

References 

Nu metal albums by English artists
1998 albums
Visible Noise albums